Grange Lido is an open-air 50 m sea-water swimming pool, or lido, in Grange-over-Sands, Cumbria, England. It opened in 1932 and closed in 1993, but campaigners are working to see it re-opened as a swimming pool. The lido is in Art Deco style, and is grade II listed.

History and architecture
The lido opened in 1932. The buildings were designed by Grange-over-Sands Urban District Council's surveyor, named Bernard Smith or Thomas Huddlestone. The lido sits on Grange promenade on the shore of Morecambe Bay, although  the changing course of the River Kent means that the sea is at some distance from the promenade, separated by salt marsh. The   pool was filled with filtered sea-water at high tide, and was unheated.

The buildings are in Art Deco style. Historic Pools of Britain describes the lido as "A very fine intact Art Deco mushroom shaped lido in a stunning setting on the edge of Morecambe Bay".

English Heritage state the reasons for the lido's grade II listing in 2011 as:

Pevsner's The Buildings of England (revised ed. 2010), within its description of Grange promenade, simply says "Lido, 1933, closed 1992, and now very forlorn".

The lido suffered damage from floods in 1977, when the outer wall was breached, but celebrated its 50th anniversary in 1982 with a special gala.

Closure and future
The lido closed in 1993, after a report suggested that necessary repairs would be too expensive to be justified.

In 2011 the Save Grange Lido campaign was established, aiming to "transform it into a vibrant community owned leisure facility with a restored 50m pool at its heart." The group has produced a detailed business plan setting out how it believes this could be achieved. It is a community benefit society.

In 2015 South Lakeland District Council began to consider future uses for the site which would not include a swimming facility: the pool area was to become a "landscaped open space". In February 2019 the council allocated £2million for "light touch refurbishment" of the lido, to include making it structurally sound, bringing it back into public use, and providing refurbished units for community groups or entrepreneurs.

References

External links
 
 Contains several archive photos and video clip of 1932 opening
Save Grange Lido

Lidos
Swimming venues in England
Sports venues in Cumbria
Grade II listed buildings in Cumbria
Grade II listed sports and recreation buildings
Sports venues completed in 1932
Grange-over-Sands
Listed sports venues in England